SideOneDummy Records is an independent record label based in Los Angeles. It was founded in 1995 by Bill Armstrong and Joe Sib. The label began as a way for them to release music for their friends' bands. Thereafter SideOneDummy launched the careers of bands like The Gaslight Anthem, Flogging Molly, Gogol Bordello, Title Fight and others. Since 1998, SideOneDummy Records has also released the annual Warped Tour compilation album, which features music by bands playing on the current year's tour. Their YouTube channel, which features artists in their current roster, has 90 thousand subscribers and 129,558,922 views (as of January 25, 2022).

Roster

 AJJ
 Astronautalis
 Cliffdiver
 Iron Chic
 Meat Wave
 Microwave
 Nahko and Medicine for the People
 Paerish
 Pkew pkew pkew
 Plasma Canvas
 PUP
 Rozwell Kid
 Safe to Say
 Chris Shiflett
 Joe Sib
 Timeshares
 Violent Soho
 John-Allison Weiss
 Worriers

Former 

 7 Seconds
 Anti-Flag
 Audra Mae
 Avoid One Thing
 Bedouin Soundclash
 Broadway Calls
 The Black Pacific
 Big D and the Kids Table
 The Casualties
 Chris Farren
 Chuck Ragan
 The Dan Band
 Fake Problems
 Flogging Molly
 Gogol Bordello

 The Gaslight Anthem
 Jeff Rosenstock
 Kill Your Idols
 The Mighty Mighty Bosstones
 Madcap
 Maxeen
 MxPx
 Piebald
The Reverend Peyton's Big Damn Band
 Slick Shoes
 The Sounds
 The Suicide Machines
 Title Fight
 VCR
 ZOX

References

External links 
 

 
Record labels established in 1995
American independent record labels
Punk record labels
Ska record labels
Hardcore record labels